S. silvestrii may refer to:
 Solenopsis silvestrii, a fire ant species
 Strongylognathus silvestrii, an ant species endemic to Greece

See also
 Silvestrii (disambiguation)